The decade of the 1200s in art involved some significant events.

Events

Art
 1200: Kaikei sculpts Mahamayuri in Kimpusen-ji, an Important Cultural Property of Japan.
 1201: Kaikei sculpts Hachiman in Tōdai-ji, a National Treasure of Japan
 1203: Kaikei with Unkei sculpts Nio in Tōdai-ji, a National Treasure of Japan
 1205: The Legend of the Seven Sleepers of Ephesus – stained glass done for Rouen Cathedral
 1205: Stone jamb figures done for Chartres Cathedral
 1206: Unknown artist sculpts Priest Chōgen in Tōdai-ji
 1207: Twelve different artists sculpt Twelve Heavenly Generals in Kōfuku-ji
 1208: Unkei sculpts Muchaku in Kōfuku-ji

Births

Deaths
 1205: Nicholas of Verdun – French goldsmith and enamellist of the Middle Ages (born 1130)
 1205: Fujiwara Takanobu – Japanese nise-e painter (died 1142)

 
Years of the 13th century in art
Art